Switzerland straddles the border between the beer-loving central European countries and the wine-loving western European and Mediterranean countries and today beer is second to wine in terms of consumption among Swiss. The country has a long tradition of brewing, with significant domestic beer production and a growing craft brewing sector.

Lagers are the most popular style, amounting to 72.2% of total beer consumption in 2020, with pale lagers being particularly popular. Switzerland ranks 33rd worldwide in annual per capita beer consumption as of 2019, behind most central European countries and ahead of Portugal, the Republic of Congo, and Canada.

History 
Beer drinking in what would become Switzerland begins with La Tène culture: Gauls who thrived around 450 BCE to the 1st century BCE were known to make the drink, along with mead and wine.

The Plan of Saint Gall, an architectural drawing dating from the 9th century CE, depicts renovations for the monastery of Saint Gall with three breweries.
Between 1935 and 1991, an agreement among nearly all Swiss brewers created a cartel in Switzerland. The cartel set beer prices and divided up the country into strict territories for each company. A consequence was stagnation in terms of innovation: because of the agreement on the types of beer produced, beer became a near-interchangeable good—brewers saw no need to distinguish themselves. The cartel's strict rules on distribution of beer meant little foreign beer was imported, despite the signing of free trade agreements with other European countries.

The cartel came to an end in the 1990s when the Cardinal, Feldschlösschen, and Hürlimann breweries left the agreement. Larger breweries began to buy smaller competitors, in turn attracting multinational brewing companies with experience in branding and marketing, who bought the large breweries in turn. However imported beer still comprised a modest market share of around 16% by the end of the 20th century.

Small-scale craft brewing experienced a boom in late 20th and early 21st centuries. The number of registered breweries grew from 81 in 2000 to over 1,000 in 2019.

Swiss beer culture 

Switzerland has cultural differences between its linguistic regions, which may affect alcohol consumption trends. For example, one survey of 2,057 Swiss residents in 2015 found the French-speaking regions (also called Romandy) consumed less beer compared to German-speaking ones, while Italian-speaking Ticino was in between.

The French-speaking cantons of Geneva, Valais, and Vaud produce large volumes of wine, which has the advantage of being easily produced domestically from locally grown grapes. Brewing usually requires importing of malt and hops, from France and Germany. Larger breweries in Romandy include the Valaisanne brewery in Sion, and the former Cardinal brewery in Fribourg. Jura is home to the Brasserie des Franches-Montagnes, which has received international attention for its barrel-aged beers.

Most contemporary large-scale breweries are in German-speaking Switzerland. The Carlsberg-owned Feldschlösschen brewery in Rheinfelden dwarfs all others in the country in terms of output. Heineken owns the large Calanda brewery in Chur (in Graubünden, officially trilingual), and produces a number of different Swiss brands. Zürich hosts the country's largest beer festival annually, and has a number of microbreweries. German-speaking Switzerland produces wine as well, though not as much as Romandy.

Ticino has a number of smaller microbreweries, and also produces red wines in its warmer climate on the south side of the Alps.

Overall consumer preference tends towards milder beers, with the country being described in 2015 as "an island of light, non-offensive, lightly aromatic lager beers in Europe".

Production today 
In 2019, beer accounted for 31.8% of the country's total alcohol consumption, compared to 49.4% for wine.

In the same year, Heineken (headquartered in the Netherlands) and Carlsberg (headquartered in Denmark), through their subsidiaries, controlled nearly 70% of the Swiss beer market.

Widely available beers include:

 Made by Carlsberg: Cardinal, Feldschlösschen, Gurten, Hürlimann, Valaisanne
 Made by Heineken: Calanda, Eichhof, Haldengut, Ittinger
 Independents: , Brasserie des Franches-Montagnes,

Regulation and taxation 
Beer with alcohol above 1.2% abv is subject to the confederation's excise tax, and increases with alcohol content.

The age for purchase of beer is 16. Beer is widely available in outlets such as supermarkets (excepting the Migros chain), corner shops, and gas stations. However, the cantons regulate alcohol sales and are free to restrict sales as they see fit. Prices for beer in bars are high by international standards, but lower when purchased at supermarkets.

References

External links 

 Swiss Brewers' Association (in French and German)
 Swiss Beer Prize (in French, German, and Italian)
 The Ultimate Guide to Swiss Beer, an enthusiast's site and database of Swiss beers (in English)

Beer in Switzerland